Zac Olejarnik is an Australian former professional rugby league footballer who played for the Penrith Panthers in the NSWRL premiership. He played as a five-eighth and later on in his career at lock. 
Olejarnik played for the NSW Colts team in 1972.

References

External links
Zac Olejarnik stats
Mighty Panthers profile

1952 births
Living people
Australian rugby league players
New South Wales rugby league team players
Penrith Panthers captains
Penrith Panthers players
Rugby league five-eighths
Rugby league locks